Bigg Boss Tamil 2 was the second season of the reality television series, Bigg Boss, and was hosted by Kamal Haasan. The season had 17 housemates (including wildcard entries), and was filmed with 60 cameras. It ran for 15 weeks (from 17 June to 30 September 2018), and aired on Star Vijay weekdays from 9–10:30 am and 9–11:00 pm on weekends. Hotstar provided content not aired on television and provided Fun Unlimited, a parallel weekly programme. Hosted by Rio Raj, it humorously described events in the house.

The first season's lavish house set, on the outskirts of Chennai at EVP Film City in Chembarambakkam, was renovated just before the start of this season. The renovated house included a "jail room" to increase the severity of punishment for contestant mistakes.

The winner of Bigg Boss Tamil 2 was Riythvika, who won a trophy and a cash prize of 50 lakhs (5 million). Aishwarya Dutta was the runner-up.

This is also the first, and till date, the only season to have a female winner in the Bigg Boss Tamil franchise.

Thaadi Balaji and Shariq Hassan returned as contestants in Bigg Boss Ultimate (season 1).

Housemate Status

Housemates

Original entrants

 Yashika Aannand, a model and actress known for her roles in the films Dhuruvangal Pathinaaru (2016) and Iruttu Araiyil Murattu Kuththu (2018)
 Ponnambalam, an actor and stuntman who has appeared primarily as an antagonist in Tamil films
 Mahat Raghavendra, an actor known for his roles in the films Mankatha (2011), Jilla (2014) and Chennai 600028 II (2016)
 Daniel Annie Pope, an actor known for his role in the film Idharkuthane Aasaipattai Balakumara (2013)
 Vaishnavi, a journalist, writer, activist and radio jockey who is the granddaughter of Tamil writer Saavi.
 Janani Iyer, an actress known for playing lead roles in the films Avan Ivan (2011), Thegidi (2014) and Adhe Kangal (2017)
 Ananth Vaidyanathan, a singing trainer known for his roles in Star Vijay's Super Singer and Avan Ivan (2011)
 Ramya NSK, playback singer and granddaughter of N. S. Krishnan and T. A. Mathuram
 Sendrayan, an actor known for his roles in the films Moodar Koodam (2013) and Metro (2016)
 Riythvika, an actress known for her roles in the films Madras (2014), Kabali (2016) and Iru Mugan (2016)
 Mumtaz, an actress and dancer who has appeared primarily in character roles and item numbers in Tamil films
 Thadi Balaji, an actor who has appeared as a comedian in Tamil films and Tamil TV serials and is a judge in Star Vijay's Kalakka Povathu Yaaru
 Mamathi Chari, a television actress, anchor and video jockey who hosted Hello Tamizha and appeared in the Sun TV series Vani Rani
 Nithya, a mom of one and she is the commoner contestant of this season. She is the spouse of co–housemate Balaji
 Shariq Hassan Khan, an actor who appeared in the film Pencil (2016) and the son of Riyaz Khan and Uma Riyaz Khan and grandson of Kamala Kamesh
 Aishwarya Dutta, an actress who appeared in the films Tamizhuku En Ondrai Azhuthavum (2015) and Paayum Puli (2015)

Wildcard entry
1.Vijayalakshmi Feroz, actress, producer and daughter of director Agathiyan who starred in the films Chennai 600028 (2007), Anjathe (2008) and Chennai 600028 II (2016) and the Sun TV series Nayaki

Guests appearance

Weekly summary

Events

 The partial audio launch of the Kamal Haasan's film Vishwaroopam 2 was held on 30 June 2018 during the ongoing season with Shruti Haasan invited as a special guest of the show to inaugurate the audio launch.
 In episode 53 (Day 52) aired on 8 August 2018, the Bigg Boss housemates were issued the notice of the death of 5-time former Chief Minister of Tamil Nadu M. Karunanidhi who died on 7 August 2018. They paid tribute to him and shared their memories of him during the show.
 On 10 September 2018 an air conditioning mechanic fell from the second floor of the set. His injuries resulted in death.
 On 26 September 2018, the Bigg Boss 2 votings were viewed in Vijay TV. When viewed, the votes of actresses Janani Iyer and Vijayalakshmi Feroz had decreased after a couple of hours instead of increasing. A rumour spread that the voting process is fake and the deducted votes from them were transferred to actress Aishwarya Dutta's votes in the final week of Bigg Boss 2.

Nomination table

Notes 

 House captain
 Former house captain
 Nominated for eviction before the regular nomination process
 Granted immunity from nomination
 Moved to the Secret Room
  indicates the winner.
  indicates the first runner up.
  indicates the second runner up.
  indicates the third runner up.
  Evicted
  Ejected
  Nominated for eviction
BOLD, If a housemates name is in bold during "against public vote" it means that they are a finalist.

Reception 
According to BARC India, the season had a TRP of 9.7 overall and 12.8 in Chennai alone, in its opening week in urban areas with 3.7 Crore viewers.

References

External links 
 Official Website at Hotstar
 

Tamil 2
2018 Indian television seasons
2018 Tamil-language television seasons
Kamal Haasan
Star Vijay original programming
Tamil-language television shows